David Carrick (born 4 January 1975) is an English serial rapist and former police officer who worked for the Metropolitan Police. He joined the police force in 2001 and worked as an armed police officer in the Parliamentary and Diplomatic Protection from 2009 until his initial suspension without pay and subsequent sacking from his position.

Carrick was arrested in 2021 and in 2022 pleaded guilty to multiple counts of rape between 2002 and 2021. In 2023, he was sentenced to life imprisonment.

Early life and education
Carrick was born in Salisbury, Wiltshire, England on 4 January 1975. At the time of his birth, his parents, a cleaner and a Royal Artillery soldier, lived at Bulford military camp. After the birth of his younger sister, the family moved to Durrington. Carrick went to Durrington comprehensive school. Carrick's parents divorced when he was a teenager.

Career and criminality
After a short career in the British Army, Carrick became a police officer with the Metropolitan Police in 2001, and joined the armed Parliamentary and Diplomatic Protection team in 2009. His employers investigated allegations that he was the perpetrator of domestic abuse in 2002. Although both the Metropolitan Police and other British police forces received multiple complaints about his behaviour, he was re-certified to remain an armed police officer in 2017. Work colleagues gave Carrick the nickname Bastard Dave, due to his propensity for cruelty.

Between 2003 and 2020, Carrick abused and raped multiple women he met using Badoo and Tinder, often in Hertfordshire, England. Using his job as an armed police officer to gain their trust and inflate his importance, he developed multiple abusive relationships with women. He degraded his victims, including physical abuse with a belt, imprisonment in small spaces, urinating on victims and rape. In some cases he controlled what his victims wore, when or what they ate, and where they slept. He would sometimes ban them from eating altogether. In October 2021, another woman reported to the police that he had date raped her a year earlier, deciding to come forward in response to the kidnapping, rape and murder of Sarah Everard by another Met officer.

That same month, Carrick was arrested and suspended from police work. Carrick initially pleaded not guilty to all the charges against him. As of May 2022 he was being held on remand at HM Prison Belmarsh in south-east London. In December 2022, at the Old Bailey criminal court in Central London, Carrick pleaded guilty to 49 charges, including 24 of rape; the charges relate to twelve female victims. On 16 January 2023, at Southwark Crown Court, he pleaded guilty to four more charges of rape.

Sadiq Khan, Mayor of London, reacted with a statement that he was "absolutely sickened and appalled". Crown Prosecution Service Chief Prosecutor Jaswant Narwal was quoted stating "the scale of the degradation Carrick subjected his victims to is unlike anything I have encountered in my 34 years with the Crown Prosecution Service".

In the wake of Carrick's conviction, the Metropolitan Police said the force was re-examining past claims of domestic abuse or sexual offences against Met officers and staff, and said the force was looking into about 1,000 of its 45,000 employees.

Carrick's sentencing hearing at Southwark Crown Court began on 6 February 2023. On 7 February 2023, he subsequently received 36 life sentences with a minimum term of 30 years plus 239 days, meaning he must serve that long in prison before becoming eligible for parole.  He will become eligible for parole on 2 May 2052.

On 8 February 2023, the Attorney General's Office announced that, after "multiple requests", they would be reviewing the sentence under the Unduly Lenient Sentence Scheme. But, on 3 March, Michael Tomlinson KC, the Solicitor-General for England and Wales, said that he was satisfied sentencing judge Mrs Justice Cheema-Grubb "gave careful and detailed consideration to all the features of this case" when deciding how much time Carrick would spend in prison, and that the sentencing would not be sent to the Court of Appeal for review.

Personal life
Before being jailed, Carrick lived in Stevenage, Hertfordshire. While being held on remand, he reportedly attempted suicide.

References

1975 births
Living people
20th-century British Army personnel
21st-century British criminals
British police officers
British police officers convicted of crimes
Criminals from Wiltshire
Date of birth missing (living people)
English people convicted of rape
Metropolitan Police officers
Rape in the 2000s
Rape in the 2010s
Rape in the 2020s
People from Salisbury
Prisoners and detainees of England and Wales